Bridouxia smithiana is a species of tropical freshwater snail with a gill and an operculum, an aquatic gastropod mollusk in the family Paludomidae.

This species is found in Lake Tanganyika in the Democratic Republic of the Congo and Tanzania. Its natural habitat is freshwater lakes. The threats are not exactly known but sedimentation is possible. Its status was Endangered since 1996 but was relisted as Data Deficient in 2004.

References

Paludomidae
Invertebrates of the Democratic Republic of the Congo
Invertebrates of Tanzania
Freshwater snails of Africa
Gastropods described in 1885
Taxonomy articles created by Polbot
Taxa named by Jules René Bourguignat